Wie is de Mol? (English: Who is the Mole?) is a Dutch adventure reality game show. It is based on the Belgian reality game show De Mol, the original version of the format created in 1998 by Woestijnvis and broadcast on VRT.

Format
Wie is de Mol? is a reality television competition involving 10 candidates. These candidates travel to a foreign country where they have to complete assignments to earn money to fill the prize pot. However, one of the participants is the Mole.  The mole's goal is to sabotage the assignments and cause the other candidates to fail and to keep the total amount of money in the pot as low as possible. The other candidates do not know who the mole is, and have to find out who this mole is.

At the end of every episode the candidates take a multiple choice test about the mole's identity. The test contains 20 questions (40 questions in the final test) about the mole's activities since the previous test and personal questions about the mole (for example, "On which team was the mole during the castle-assignment" or "Has the mole been baptized?"). With the help of 'jokers', which they can earn during the assignments, the contestants can turn incorrect test answers into correct answers.

The person with the fewest correct answers is then expelled from the show. In most series this process continues until only two contestants and the mole remain. The winner is the person with the most correct answers in the final test and he or she gets all of the money earned during the previous stages of the game.

In 2021, a television show aired called De Verraders which is produced by the same company that produces Wie is de Mol?. In this show, there are three traitors and the viewer is made aware who they are but the other contestants don't know who they are. In contrast to Wie is de Mol?, this show does not focus on sabotaging assignments but on psychological manipulation and the process of uncovering who the traitors are.

Hosts
Color key:

Notes

Seasons 

The first four seasons of Wie is de Mol? had ordinary people as participants. After the break in 2004, all participants in the following seasons were Dutch celebrities.

The 7th season in 2007 was the first season to have four finalists, with two runner-ups.

The 18th season in 2018 was the first to be located in six countries: Armenia, Azerbaijan, Kazakhstan, Russia, Ukraine, and Georgia.

In September 2020, a special jubilee season aired in celebration of twenty seasons of Wie is de Mol?.

Junior editions

Locations map

 The 1999 and 2005 seasons of the show were both filmed in Australia (in 2005, part of the show was also filmed in Indonesia).
 The 2013 and 2023 seasons of the show were both filmed in South Africa.

Ratings

References

External links 

 Format license owner: The New Flemish Primitives
 Official homepage
 
 
 
 Mol Talk

 
1999 Dutch television series debuts
Dutch game shows
NPO 1 original programming